Mendo de Benavides (1569 – 17 October 1644) was a Roman Catholic prelate who served as Bishop of Cartagena (1640–1644) and Bishop of Segovia (1533–1540).

Biography
Mendo de Benavides born in Santisteban del Puerto, Spain. On 18 July 1633, he was selected by the King of Spain and confirmed by Pope Urban VIII as Bishop of Segovia. On 1 January 1634, he was consecrated bishop by Juan Arauz Díaz, Bishop of Guadix with Luis Camargo Pacheco, Auxiliary Bishop of Sevilla, and Marcos Ramírez de Prado y Ovando, Bishop of Chiapas, serving as co-consecrators. On 19 November 1640, he was selected by the King of Spain and confirmed by Pope Urban VIII as Bishop of Cartagena. He served as Bishop of Cartagena until his death on 17 October 1644.

See also 
Catholic Church in Spain

References

External links and additional sources
 (for Chronology of Bishops) 
 (for Chronology of Bishops) 
 (for Chronology of Bishops) 
 (for Chronology of Bishops) 

1569 births
1644 deaths
17th-century Roman Catholic bishops in Spain
Bishops appointed by Pope Urban VIII